The Scoville scale is a measurement of the pungency (spicy heat) of chili peppers or other spicy foods.

Scoville may also refer to:
 Scoville Library, a library in Salisbury, Connecticut, U.S.
 Scoville Memorial Library (Carleton College), a historic building in Northfield, Minnesota, U.S.
 Scoville Park, a park in Oak Park, Illinois, U.S.
 Scoville Square or Scoville Block, a historic building in Oak Park, Illinois, U.S.
 Scoville Stardust, a homebuilt aircraft designed for air racing

People with the surname
 Darrel Scoville (born 1975), Canadian ice hockey player
 Jonathan Scoville (1830–1891), U.S. Representative from New York
 Nick Scoville, American astronomer 
 Wilbur Scoville (1865–1942), American pharmacist, known for the Scoville scale
 William Beecher Scoville (1906–1984), American neurosurgeon

People with the given name
 Scoville Browne (1909–1994), American jazz reedist
 Scoville Jenkins (born 1986), American tennis player

See also
 Escoville, a village in Normandy, France
 Herbert Scoville Jr. Peace Fellowship, an American intern program